Godfreys is an Australian- and New Zealand–based retailer in the domestic and commercial floorcare & cleaning industry. The company was founded by Godfrey Cohen in 1931, and it has since grown to approximately 200 company- and franchise-owned stores combined across Australia and New Zealand.

History 

Godfrey Cohen founded the first Godfreys store in 1931 in the Prahran Market, Melbourne, simultaneously revolutionising the vacuum cleaner business in Australia. It wasn't long before John Johnston came across Godfrey Cohen's business, and the two quickly became business partners over a simple handshake that lasted for over 70 years. Over this period, the business rapidly expanded within Australia as demand from customers increased after World War II, and the product range grew from solely bagged vacuum cleaners to include steam mops, carpet shampooers, robotic vacuums, handstick vacuums, wet & dry vacuums, handheld vacuums, hard floor cleaners, garment steamers, backpack vacuums, floor polishers, carpet blowers, bagless vacuums, cleaning consumables and more including a range of anti-allergy, asthma and pet hair vacuum cleaners recognised by the National Asthma Council Australia as Sensitive Choice approved.

Godfrey Cohen died in 2004, and Godfreys was sold to private equity companies Pacific Equity Partners and CCMP Capital Asia for $350 million in 2006. The company was relisted on the Australian Securities Exchange in 2014 at $2.75 per share, but it was subsequently removed from the ASX in July 2018 after John Johnston, who first joined Godfreys in 1936 as a partner, proposed a private takeover of the company. Johnston died soon after the successful takeover; he was 100 years old. His family company already owned 28% of the shares prior to this takeover.

Company overview 

Godfreys consists of a combination of approximately 200 company and franchise stores in Australia and New Zealand. Together with their retail stores, Godfreys operates multiple service and repair centres across the two countries.

Brands 
Godfreys currently holds the licence to distribute Hoover-branded vacuum cleaners in Australia and New Zealand. In addition to the Hoover brand, Godfreys also owns the exclusive distribution rights to Wertheim, Vorwerk floorcare range, Pullman, and Sauber cleaning products.

Godfreys also supplies Nilfisk, Vax, Miele, Electrolux, Bissell, Black & Decker, Numatic and more cleaning machines for the domestic and commercial cleaning market.

Financing partnerships 

Godfreys provides customers, both online and in store, with alternative payment options from Humm (since April 2019), Afterpay and Openpay to bring more affordability to customers in the floorcare market.

Advertising 

Godfreys has obtained brand awareness in Australia and New Zealand through many years of similar television advertisements featuring John Hardy.

Awards 

The company has won the following awards:

 Power Retail's Top 100 Online Retailers of 2020, at rank 65.

References

External links
 
 Australian Securities Exchange  Godfreys Group Limited (GFY) stock quote

Retail companies of Australia
Australian companies established in 1931
Retail companies established in 1931
Companies based in Melbourne
Home appliance manufacturers of Australia
Vacuum cleaner manufacturers